Prokunino is a rural locality (a village) in Muromtsevskoye Rural Settlement, Sudogodsky District, Vladimir Oblast, Russia. The population was 24 as of 2010.

Geography 
It is located on the Poboyka River, 15 km south from Sudogda.

References 

Rural localities in Sudogodsky District